Grass roots may refer to:

Botanical
Literally, the roots of grass

Business
Grass Roots (company), a British company

Film and television
Grass Roots (TV series), an Australian television series that ran from 2000 and 2003
Grassroots (TV series), a South African television series that ran from 2019
Grass Roots (TV movie) a 1992 made-for-television film directed by Jerry London 
Grass Roots (film), an upcoming claymation film based on the Fabulous Furry Freak Brothers comic
Grassroots (film), a 2012 film

Literary 
Grass Roots (novel), the fourth novel in the Will Lee series by Stuart Woods

Music
The Grass Roots, a U.S. rock & roll band
Grassroots (album), a 1994 album by 311
Grass Roots (Andrew Hill album), 1968
Grassroots, a 1996 EP by Tricky
Grass Roots (Atban Klann album)
Grass Roots: The Best of the New Grass Revival, an album by New Grass Revival
Grass Roots (Grass Roots album), 2012
The Finger Lakes GrassRoots Festival of Music and Dance, a roots music festival held in Trumansburg, New York

Political
Grassroots, a political movement driven "from below" by the fundamental constituents of a community.
Grassroots democracy, a political design
Grassroots (organization), a Western New York political organization
Grassroots Party